Joyce Irene Grenfell OBE (née Phipps; 10 February 1910 – 30 November 1979) was an English diseuse, singer, actress and writer. She was known for the songs and monologues she wrote and performed, at first in revues and later in her solo shows. She never appeared as a stage actress, but had roles, mostly comic, in many films, including Miss Gossage in The Happiest Days of Your Life (1950) and Police Sergeant Ruby Gates in the St Trinian's series (from 1954). She was a well-known broadcaster on radio and television. As a writer, she was the first radio critic for The Observer, contributed to Punch and published a volume of memoirs.

Born to an affluent Anglo-American family, Grenfell had abandoned early hopes of becoming an actress when she was invited to perform a comic monologue in a West End revue in 1939. Its success led to a career as an entertainer, giving her creations in theatres in five continents between 1940 and 1969.

Life and career

Early years
Born in Montpelier Square, Knightsbridge, London, Grenfell was the daughter of an American socialite, Nora Langhorne (1889–1955), one of five daughters of Chiswell Langhorne, an American railway millionaire, and of the architect Paul Phipps (1880–1953), the grandson of Charles Paul Phipps and a second cousin of the diseuse Ruth Draper, in whose professional footsteps she followed. The Phipps family were wealthy clothiers, whose success allowed them to join the gentry of their native Wiltshire. Nancy Astor was one of her maternal aunts; Grenfell often visited her at the Astors’ home of Cliveden and lived in a cottage on the estate, a mile from the main house, in the early years of her marriage.

Joyce Phipps had an upper middle-class London childhood. Among her friends was Virginia Graham, with whom she kept up a lifelong correspondence, and who wrote Grenfell's biography in the Oxford Dictionary of National Biography. Grenfell attended the Francis Holland School in central London, and the Claremont Fan Court School, in Esher, Surrey. She then went to a finishing school in Paris at the age of 17. After this she enrolled at the Royal Academy of Dramatic Art in London, but found the hard work of learning the craft of acting less glamorous than she had imagined and left after a single term. She supposed at the time that this "was the finish of my dreams of becoming an actress". In May 1928 she was presented as a débutante at Buckingham Palace.

In 1927 she had met Reginald Pascoe Grenfell (1903–1993), a mining executive and later a lieutenant colonel in the King's Royal Rifle Corps. They were married two years later at St Margaret's, Westminster, and remained together until her death nearly 50 years later. They were a devoted couple: Reggie Grenfell looked after his wife's financial and business affairs, and his encouragement gave her strong support. After she became a celebrity she unobtrusively made sure that he was never seen as a mere adjunct to her. They were unable to have children of their own.

Early career
In the late 1930s Grenfell contributed verses to Punch and helped to entertain her aunt's guests at Cliveden. After one lunch, J. L. Garvin, the editor of The Observer, engaged her as the paper's first radio critic. At an informal supper given by the BBC producer Stephen Potter in January 1939, she agreed to his request to entertain her fellow guests with a monologue of her own devising. This was "Useful and Acceptable Gifts", in which she played a gauche lecturer at a meeting of the Women's Institute. The impresario Herbert Farjeon was among the guests and he invited her to perform the piece in his forthcoming revue at the Little Theatre, London. She was an immediate success, winning glowing notices. The Stage judged her "outstanding ... this clever diseuse successfully catches the naif manner of an amateur speaker lecturing on 'useful and acceptable gifts', and gives us a neat and satirical impersonation of an American mother listening to her small daughter reciting Shelley's 'Ode to a Skylark'". The Tatler found her two monologues "quite the best items in the programme". The Sketch devoted a full page to photographs of her in her different characters. The Bystander thought that Grenfell challenged the celebrated Ruth Draper "on her own pitch ... carry[ing] off the acting honours of this gay and intelligent entertainment."

During the Second World War Grenfell wrote for and appeared in three more West End revues: Diversion and Diversion No. 2 at Wyndham's Theatre in 1940 and 1941, and Light and Shade at the Ambassadors in 1942. In early 1942 she met the composer Richard Addinsell. Together they wrote many successful songs including "I'm Going to See You Today" and "Turn Back the Clock", which, in the words of the biographer Janie Hampton, "aptly caught the public mood".

In 1941 Grenfell appeared in her first film role, as the American mother in Carol Reed's short documentary A Letter from Home. She made three more films during the war. For BBC radio, together with Potter, she wrote and starred in an occasional radio series called How to …, which ran intermittently from 1943 until 1962 offering humorous advice on how (and how not) to do things. In 1943 she made her only attempt at acting in a stage play: she resigned from the cast of a West End production of the American comedy Junior Miss after the first three days of rehearsal, finding that onstage she could only perform looking straight at an audience, and could not "act sideways", although she found some film acting roles "fun to do".

In the later years of the war Grenfell toured in the UK for ENSA, sometimes with Addinsell accompanying her at the piano. In late 1943 the head of ENSA, Basil Dean, invited the two to tour troop camps and hospitals in North Africa, the Middle East and elsewhere. Addinsell's health was too fragile to permit him to accept, and Grenfell recruited Viola Tunnard, later better known as a close colleague of Benjamin Britten. In 1944 and 1945 they performed in Algeria, Malta, Sicily, Italy, Iran, Iraq, India and Egypt.

Post-war work 
Back in London Grenfell wrote the song "Du Maurier" (music by Addinsell) and the monologue "Travelling Broadens the Mind", both of which she performed in Noël Coward's first post-war revue, Sigh No More (1945). Coward had been a family friend since Grenfell was a girl. At first he had viewed her transition from amateur to professional with some doubt, Within a few years he had come to recognise her professionalism, her skill as a performer ("good in all she does on the stage") and the quality of her monologues, even if "she shouldn't write lyrics." In addition to her own two numbers, she sang Coward's comic catalogue of domestic disasters "That is the End of the News", "disguised as a schoolgirl with pigtails, all my make-up off, a shiny face and a terrible grin."

After the 1947 revue Tuppence Coloured, Grenfell developed new sketches including the first of her six Nursery School monologues, with the harassed teacher's recurring cry to one of her unseen charges, "George – don't do that...." In the 1951 revue Penny Plain she performed her "Joyful Noise" (music by Donald Swann), a parody of an amateur choir ("And some of us cannot sing much, And some can't sing at all, But how we love our outings to the Royal Albert Hall"). After this, Grenfell and Tunnard made another tour entertaining British troops in North Africa.

Joyce Grenfell Requests the Pleasure (1954) was her first more or less solo West End show (there were three dancers providing interludes between Grenfell's numbers). The Stage commented that any doubts that Grenfell could sustain a solo evening were quickly dispelled:

After two provincial tours and a year in London she took the show to Broadway, where it had a sell-out eight-week run. For this show there was a pit band of eight players directed by William Blezard. In later shows Grenfell simplified the format further, dispensing with dancers and band, and being accompanied only by Blezard at the piano.

During the 1950s and 1960s Grenfell appeared in a number of films including as Miss Gossage in The Happiest Days of Your Life (1950), Police Sergeant Ruby Gates in  the St Trinian's series, Mrs Barham in The Americanization of Emily and Hortense Astor in The Yellow Rolls-Royce. Away from the theatre, Grenfell served as a member of the influential Pilkington Committee on Broadcasting from 1960 to 1962, and was president of the Society of Women Broadcasters and Writers.

The rest of Grenfell's stage career was in a series of solo shows in London and on tour. Between 1957 and 1970 she gave her show Joyce Grenfell in Australia, Canada, Hong Kong, New Zealand, Singapore, Switzerland and the United States, as well as around Britain and in the West End. Her last live performance was at Windsor Castle for the Queen's Waterloo Dinner in 1973.

Last years and legacy
Soon after the Windsor Castle show Grenfell was taken ill with an eye condition, which was subsequently diagnosed as cancer. As a convinced Christian Scientist (like her aunt Nancy), she was averse to doctors and hospitals. Her husband did not share her beliefs and prevailed on her to undergo treatment. The eye had to be removed and replaced with a glass one. After this Grenfell did not return to the stage, but gave talks for charitable organisations and appeared frequently on the BBC television programme Face the Music.

In October 1979 she became seriously ill and died a month later, on 30 November 1979, just before her golden wedding anniversary. She was cremated at Golders Green Crematorium on 4 December and her ashes scattered there. On 7 February 1980 a memorial service was held at Westminster Abbey.

Grenfell was created an Officer of the Order of the British Empire (OBE) in 1946 for her war work. It was confirmed after her death that she would have been made a Dame Commander (DBE) in the 1980 New Year Honours List. In 1998, the Royal Mail memorialised Grenfell with her image on a postage stamp as part of a series of stamps celebrating five comedians, drawn by Gerald Scarfe.

Grenfell's widower, Reggie Grenfell, died in Chelsea, London, in 1993, aged 89.

In 2002 her friend Janie Hampton published a biography, Joyce Grenfell. Maureen Lipman toured with the one-woman show Re: Joyce!, which she co-wrote with James Roose-Evans. In it she recreates some of Grenfell's best-known sketches. Lipman also presented the radio programme Choice Grenfell, compiled from Grenfell's writings. Roose-Evans also edited Darling Ma, a 1997 collection of Grenfell's letters to her mother.

Stage performances

The Little Revue – Little Theatre, London (1939–40)
Diversion – Wyndham's Theatre, London (1940-1)
Light and Shade – Ambassador's Theatre, London (1942)
ENSA tours of UK (1942)
ENSA tour of North Africa with Viola Tunnard (1944)
ENSA tour of the Middle East and India with Viola Tunnard (1944-5)
Sigh No More – Piccadilly Theatre, London (1945-6)
Tuppence Coloured – UK tour, followed by Lyric Theatre, Hammersmith and Globe Theatre, London (1947-8)
Penny Plain – St Martin's Theatre, London and UK tour (1951–2)
Six-week tour for British troops in Libya and Egypt with Viola Tunnard (1952)
Joyce Grenfell Requests the Pleasure – UK tour, then Fortune Theatre and St Martin's Theatre, London, then another UK tour (1954-5)
Joyce Grenfell Requests the Pleasure – Bijou Theatre, New York City (1955)
Joyce Grenfell at Home – tour of Canada, Washington DC and Lyceum Theatre, New York City, with George Bauer (1956)
Tour of Northern Rhodesia with Viola Tunnard (1956)
Joyce Grenfell at Home – tour of Dublin and the UK, then Lyric Theatre, Hammersmith (1957)
Joyce Grenfell Bids You Good Evening – tour of Canada and North America, with George Bauer (1958)
Meet Joyce Grenfell – Philip Street Theatre, Sydney, with William Blezard (1959)
Meet Joyce Grenfell – tour of UK with William Blezard (1960)
Joyce Grenfell – Haymarket Theatre, London, followed by UK tour with William Blezard (1962)
Joyce Grenfell – tour of Australia with William Blezard (1963)
Tours of Canada, Switzerland and Hong Kong with William Blezard (1964)
Tours of UK, Australia and New Zealand with William Blezard (1966)
Tours of UK, Hong Kong, USA and Canada with William Blezard (1967)
Tour of UK with William Blezard (1968)
Tour of Australia and New Zealand with William Blezard (1969)
Tours of UK and USA with William Blezard (1970)
Tour of UK with William Blezard (1972)
Waterloo Dinner, Windsor Castle (1973)

Film performances

Publications

Notes, references and sources

Notes

References

Sources

</ref>

External links

Joyce Grenfell archive at the University of Bristol Theatre Collection, University of Bristol
BBC Radio 4 Great Lives on Joyce Grenfell – listen online: BBC Radio 4 – Great Lives, Series 15, Joyce Grenfell

1910 births
1979 deaths
20th-century English actresses
20th-century English comedians
20th-century English singers
20th-century English women singers
Actresses from London
British comedy actresses
British debutantes
Deaths from cancer in England
English Christian Scientists
English comedy musicians
English film actresses
English people of American descent
English songwriters
English stage actresses
English television actresses
English women comedians
Entertainments National Service Association personnel
Golders Green Crematorium
Monologists
Officers of the Order of the British Empire
People educated at Claremont Fan Court School
People educated at Francis Holland School
People from Knightsbridge
Grenfell family